The Sunni Endowment Office is an Iraqi administration created by the Iraqi Governing Council after the fall of Saddam Hussein in 2003. It was created from the dissolution of the Ministry of Awqaf and religious Affairs in former Baath rule, separating from it the religious endowments of Shi'ites and non-Islamic religions.

Its function is the administration of the mosques and other endowments of Sunnis in Iraq.

Rules
The creation of the Office passed through the Resolution No. 29 of 30 August 2003, that ordered the dissolution of the Ministry of Awqaf and religious Affairs (Wizarat al-Awqaf) and the creation of three new Endowments offices (Diwan al-Waqf) for the administration of the religious endowments of Sunnis, Shiites and Other religions:
Sunni Endowment Diwan 
Shiite Endowment Diwan
Endowment Diwan of non muslim communities.
As a matter of fact, the majority of the endowments of the former Ministry of Waqf were made up of Sunni mosques, while the number of Shiite mosques was low, because in the former rule only Sunni Islam was protected by law.

The President of the Office is chosen by the Head of the Government. But in October 2012 the Iraqi General Assembly, with the Laws No. 56 and 57, for the Sunni Waqf and the Shiite Waqf respectively, stated that, before the appointment by the Iraqi Premier, the President of the Sunni Endowment Office should be approved by the Fiqh Council of Senior Scholars for Preaching and Fatwas, as representative of the Sunnis, and the President of the Shiite Endowment Office by the Great Ayatollah, as representative of the Shiites.

Sunni Endowment

After the separation of the holy places of shiite Muslims and of other religions, the Sunni Endowment Office is responsible only for Sunni mosques and religious endowments. The office has also a new section for cultural moderation.

On 22 October 2003, the Iraqi Governing Council appointed sheikh Adnan al-Dulaimi, as President of the Sunni Waqf Office.

In July 2005, the Iraqi Islamic Party, only Sunni party to participate in the new Iraqi General Assembly, appointed his deputy Ahmad Abd al-Ghafur al-Samarrai. 

In the following years, as soon as the Iraqi insurgency was defeated, also the mosques administrated by the insurgents were transferred by the Iraqi Army to the Diwan.

In November 2013, during a new escalation of Sunni insurgency, the Shiite Premier Nuri al-Maliki suspended the President of Sunni Waqf Office Samarrai, and appointed his deputy sheikh Mahmud al-Sumaydai, considered a more moderate Muslim.

In June 2015, the new Iraqi Premier Haider al-Abadi, head of a government of broad coalition, appointed sheikh Abd al-Latif al-Humaym, as President of the Sunni Endowment Office, despite the veto of the Fiqh Council of Sunni ulema, of Islamist tendency, and the opposition of the Sunni Iraqi Fatwa Council, more linked to the Popular Mobilization Forces and to the Shiite parties.

As soon as the Iraqi Army gained new areas to the Daesh, the President of the Diwan, Humaym, cooperated to rebuild the places destroyed by the war, as the town of Ramadi after its liberation in 2016, and the Great Mosque of al-Nuri of Mosul in 2018

List 
Adnan al-Dulaymi (from April 2003 to July 2005)
Ahmad Abd al-Ghafur al-Samarrai,(from July 2005 to November 2013)
Mahmud al-Sumaydai (from November 2013 to June 2015)
Abd al-Latif al-Humaym (from June 2015 to February 2020)
 Saad Kambash (from February 2020)

See also 
Iraqi Islamic Party
Imam Ahmad Bin Hanbal Shrine, under the endowment

Bibliography 
 [1]: Stephan Talmon, The Occupation of Iraq: Volume 2: The Official Documents of the Coalition Provisional Authority and the Iraqi Governing Council, Bloomsbury Publishing, 8 February 2013 - 1572 pages

External links 
Sunni Endowment Diwan (official site)

References 

Government agencies of Iraq
2003 establishments in Iraq
Government agencies established in 2003